Jagodziński  (feminine: Jagodzińska ; plural: Jagodzińscy ) is a Polish surname which is most frequent in the central voivodeships of Greater Poland, Kuyavia-Pomerania, Łódź and Masovia and can also be found among the Polish diaspora. It was first recorded in 1400 and is of toponymic origin, deriving from either one of several Polish locations named Jagodno, but most probably from the Jagodno in the Greater Poland Voivodeship. The place name Jagodno itself is derived from the west Slavic word "jagoda" for berry.

People
 Anna Jagodzińska (born 1987), Polish fashion model 
 Christian Jagodzinski (born 1969), German Internet entrepreneur and real estate investor
 Henryk Jagodziński (1925–2002), Polish Olympic athlete
 Henryk Jagodziński (nuncio) (born 1969), Vatican diplomat
 Jeff Jagodzinski (born 1963), American football coach
 Julita Jagodzińska (born 1997), Polish racing cyclist
 Stefan Jagodziński, Polish resistance fighter and Righteous Among the Nations
 Carmen Voicu-Jagodzinsky (born 1981), Romanian chess master

See also
 
 Jagoda
 Jahoda

References

Polish-language surnames